George S. Day is an educator and consultant in the fields of marketing, strategy and innovation management. He is the Geoffrey T. Boisi Professor Emeritus at the Wharton School of the University of Pennsylvania. He founded the Mack Institute for Innovation Management at the Wharton School, where he is presently Faculty Emeritus in Residence.

He is best known for the concept of market-driven strategy and organization, and the outside-in approach to strategy. With Paul Schoemaker, he introduced the concept of peripheral vision of organizations, which has been broadened to organizational vigilance and preparedness for a turbulent future.

His research and consulting interests focus on competitive strategies in global markets, innovation and organic growth, marketing management, strategic-making processes and methods, foresight capabilities, and organizational change.

Education
Day obtained a bachelor's degree in Applied Science from the University of British Columbia and an MBA with high distinction from the University of Western Ontario. He received a PhD degree from Columbia University in 1968.

Career
Day has taught at Stanford University, IMD (International Management Development Institute) in Lausanne, Switzerland, and the University of Toronto, and has held visiting appointments at MIT, the Harvard Business School, the London Business School and the Indian School of Business.  Prior to joining the Wharton School, he was Executive Director of the Marketing Science Institute, an industry-supported research consortium.

He has been a consultant to numerous corporations such as AT&T, General Electric, IBM, Metropolitan Life, Marriott, Whirlpool Corporation, Molson Companies, Unilever, E.I. DuPont de Nemours, W. L. Gore and Associates, Boeing, LG Corp., Merck, Johnson & Johnson, Corp U, and Medtronic.

He is past chairman of the American Marketing Association and currently serves as a director of the Biosciences Research and Education Foundation, the Lower Merion Conservancy, the Free Library of Philadelphia and the Zoological Society of Philadelphia. He is the co-chair of the Ag Sustainability Center of the Sonoma County Winegrowers and a Trustee of the Marketing Science Institute.

He presently serves on three editorial boards and has authored twenty books in the areas of marketing and strategic management.  He has directed and participated in senior management programs in 20 countries, including the United States, Canada, Europe, Japan, Singapore, South Africa, India, Latin America, Mexico, Australia, and New Zealand.

Awards 
Day has received numerous awards including two Alpha Kappa Psi Foundation Awards and two Harold H. Maynard Awards for the best articles published in the Journal of Marketing. In 2003 he received the Sheth Foundation Journal of Marketing Award for articles making long-run contributions to the field of marketing.  In 1994, he received the Charles Coolidge Parlin Award, which each year honors an outstanding leader in the field of marketing, and in 1996 he received the Paul D. Converse Award for outstanding contributions to the development of the science of marketing.  He was selected as the outstanding marketing educator for 1999 by the Academy of Marketing Science. In 2001 he received the Mahajan Award for career contributions to marketing strategy by the American Marketing Association, and in 2003 he received the AMA/Irwin/McGraw-Hill Distinguished Marketing Educator award.  INFORMS determined that two of his articles were among the top 25 most influential articles in marketing science in the past 25 years.  In 2011 he was selected as one of the eleven "Legends in Marketing," and in 2017 he was awarded the William L. Wilkie, "Marketing a Better World Award." In 2020 he was awarded the Sheth Medal, a bi-annual award for exceptional contributions to marketing scholarship and practice.

Bibliography

Books 
 1990 Market Driven Strategy - Processes for Creating Value
 1997 Wharton on Dynamic Competitive Strategy (jointly with David Reibstein)
 1999 The Market Driven Organization
 2000 Wharton on Managing Emerging Technologies (jointly with Paul J. H. Schoemaker)
 2006 Peripheral Vision: Detecting the Weak Signals that Will Make or Break Your Company with Paul J. H. Schoemaker
 2010 Strategy from the Outside In (with Christine Moorman)
 2013 Innovation Prowess: Leadership Strategies for Accelerating Growth
 2019 See Sooner/Act Faster: How Vigilant Leaders Thrive in an Era of Digital Turbulence (with Paul Schoemaker)
 2021 Advanced Introduction to Marketing Strategy

Articles 
He is the co-editor (with David Montgomery) of the 1999 special issue of the Journal of Marketing and has published 127 articles in Harvard Business Review, California Management Review, Strategic Management Journal, Long Range Planning, Strategy & Leadership, Journal of Marketing Research, Journal of Marketing and MIT Sloan Management Review.

References

American business theorists
Year of birth missing (living people)
Living people
American marketing people
Marketing people
Marketing theorists
Fellows of the American Marketing Association
University of Pennsylvania faculty
Stanford University Graduate School of Business faculty
Harvard Business School faculty
Academics of London Business School
Columbia Business School alumni